Daviau is a surname.  Notable people with the surname include:

Allen Daviau (1942–2020), American cinematographer
Diane-Monique Daviau (born 1951), Canadian educator, writer, translator, and journalist
Rob Daviau, American game designer
Thérèse Daviau (1946–2002), Canadian politician and attorney